Qatana is a city in southern Syria, administratively part of the Qatana District of Rif Dimashq Governorate. Qatana has an altitude of 879 meters. According to the Syria Central Bureau of Statistics, the city had a population of 33,996 in the 2004 census. It is the administrative center of the Qatana Subdistrict, which contained 20 localities with a collective population of 147,451 in 2004.

History
In the early 13th-century, during Ayyubid rule, Yaqut al-Hamawi noted Katana  as "one of the villages of Damascus". Tamerlane camped at Qatana during the siege of Damascus in 1400–1401; hence, the region was called as "Wadi Al-Ajam" afterwards.

In 1838, it was noted as a predominantly Sunni Muslim village.

Climate
Qatana has a cold semi-arid climate (Köppen climate classification: BSk). Rainfall is higher in winter than in summer. About  of precipitation falls annually.

References

Bibliography

 
 
 

Alawite communities in Syria
Populated places in Qatana District
Christian communities in Syria
Cities in Syria